

Historical and architectural interest bridges

Major bridges

References 
 

 

 Others references

See also 

 Transport in Iran
 List of roads and highways in Iran
 Islamic Republic of Iran Railways
 Geography of Iran

External links

Further reading 
 
 

Iran

Bridges
b